Going-to-the-Sun Mountain is a  mountain peak located in Glacier National Park in the U.S. state of Montana. It rises dramatically above St. Mary Valley just north of the Going-to-the-Sun Road. The mountain was named by James Willard Schultz in 1888.

Origin of name
During the winter of 1887–1888, James Willard Schultz, an early hunting guide in the St. Mary Lakes region, and his family built a cabin on the north shore of upper Saint Mary Lake.  While hunting on Red Eagle Mountain with his Pikuni friend, Tail-Feathers-Coming-Over-the-Hill, Schultz gave this mountain the name it bears today.  Warren Hanna, Schultz's biographer describes the naming thus:

Alternatively, numerous Blackfeet Indian legends are credited with the origins of the mountains' name. Used by the Blackfeet as a location for vision quests, it is one of the most accessible major mountain peaks in Glacier National Park. According to several sources, the actual Blackfeet name for the mountain is The-Face-of-Sour-Spirit-Who-Went-Back-to-The-Sun-After-His-Work-Was-Done Mountain, in explanation of the snowfields on the mountainside which, as viewed from the west, make the outline of a face.

Geology 

Like other mountains in Glacier National Park, the mountain is composed of sedimentary rock laid down during the Precambrian to Jurassic periods.

Climate 
According to the Köppen climate classification system, the mountain is located in an alpine subarctic climate zone with long, cold, snowy winters, and cool to warm summers. Winter temperatures can drop below −10 °F with wind chill factors below −30 °F. Due to its altitude, it receives precipitation all year, as snow in winter, and as thunderstorms in summer. Precipitation runoff from the mountain drains into tributaries of the Saint Mary River.

See also
 List of mountains and mountain ranges of Glacier National Park (U.S.)

Notes

Further reading
 

Blackfeet Nation
Mountains of Glacier National Park (U.S.)
Mountains of Glacier County, Montana
Religious places of the indigenous peoples of North America
Lewis Range
Mountains of Montana
Going-to-the-Sun Road